Samuel Victor Alexander Oud (born 3 September 1978 in Woerden) is a Dutch slalom canoeist who competed at the international level from 1995 to 2005.

Oud won a silver medal in the K1 team event at the 2003 ICF Canoe Slalom World Championships in Augsburg. He represented the Netherlands at the 2004 Summer Olympics in Athens, where he finished in eighth in the K1 event.

References

Oud at the Dutch Olympic Archive

1978 births
Canoeists at the 2004 Summer Olympics
Dutch male canoeists
Living people
Olympic canoeists of the Netherlands
People from Woerden
Medalists at the ICF Canoe Slalom World Championships
20th-century Dutch people
21st-century Dutch people
Sportspeople from Utrecht (province)